was a doctor practicing Western medicine and also a patriot in the closing days of the Tokugawa shogunate. He is well known as the doctor who saved the life of Inoue Kaoru, who was severely wounded by would-be assassins. He was also a staff officer of Takasugi Shinsaku.

Biography 
Ikutaro Tokoro (ja), formerly Ikutaro Yabashi, was a doctor practicing Western medicine and a patriot in the closing days of the Tokugawa shogunate.

He was born in Akasaka-juku (Nakasendō) in 1838 as the 4th son of Mataichi Yabashi (矢橋亦一). Later this "Yabashi" family had to moved out of the homeland because Ikutaro became a supporter of the doctrine of  restoring the emperor. At the age of 11 Ikutaro became the son-in-law of Iori Tokoro (所伊織) who also had to move out of the homeland for the very same reason.

Ikutaro entered into Tekijuku. He had the reputation of being a brilliant student and enjoyed the companionship of Fukuzawa Yukichi, Ōmura Masujirō and so on.

He became the head of the Kyoto Residence of Chōshū Domain upon the recommendation of Katsura Kogorō (later Kido Takayoshi).

In 1864 Ikutaro succeeded in saving the life of Inoue Kaoru by sewing about 50 stitches of tatami needle in the wounds on the whole body without anesthesia because of emergency during the domestic war time. At that time Inoue Kaoru had been severely wounded by the attack of Zokuron-tō (Sodetogi-bashi Bridge (袖解橋) incident), received a near-fatal injury and had been appealing to Kaoru's brother for beheading right after the attack. The episode that then Inoue's mother, holding bloody Inoue, dissuaded his brother from beheading by saying "What's this? If he dies, he'll be unable to do his best for the country".

This episode was introduced in the National  Primary School Reader of the 5th Period. Before World War II everyone knew this episode.

Ikutaro became staff officer of Takasugi Shinsaku. It is said that Ikutaro Tokoro, temperate and elegant person, didn't fawn although he rendered good service to the country and Chōshū and that even Takasugi Shinsaku with a fiery temperament followed Ikutaro's opinions even if they were against Takasugi's will.

Ikutaro Tokoro died of typhoid in camp at the age of 27.

He was enshrined in Kyoto Ryozen Gokoku Shrine in 1869.

Ikutaro Tokoro was awarded the title of ju shi-i no ge (従四位下, Junior Fourth Rank, Lower Grade) by the recommendation of Inoue Kaoru, Shinagawa Yajirō and so on.

Ikutaro was also awarded by the erection of the monument at the site of the demolished Tokoro's house in Ono Town, where Ikutaro as a member of the Tokoros grew up, with the cooperation of Marquis Inoue Saburō, grandson of Inoue Kaoru.

Inoue Kaoru rehabilitated the extinct family, the Tokoros, by bringing up Ikutaro's nephew from the family, the Yabashis, where Ikutaro was born, whose name was Minokichi Yabashi, in Inoue's residence at Torii-Zaka, Tokyo (now, International House of Japan).

Thus the conferment of the Imperial court rank (Junior Fourth Rank, Lower Grade), the erection of the monument and the rehabilitation of the extinct Tokoro family, namely Inoue Kaoru's wishes, came to be realized with the help of the later generation.

The Statue of Ikutaro Tokoro was built in Akasaka-juku (Nakasendō) where he was born. Inscription says as follows.

Alongside the statue of Inoue Kaoru in Yudaonsen there is the monument to honor Ikutaro Tokoro which says as follows.

References 

1838 births
1865 deaths
19th-century Japanese physicians